Romy Speelman (born 24 October 2000) is a Dutch footballer who plays as a midfielder for ADO Den Haag in the Eredivisie.

Personal life
Speelman was born in Rijswijk.

References

Living people
Dutch women's footballers
Eredivisie (women) players
2000 births
People from Rijswijk
Women's association football midfielders
ADO Den Haag (women) players
Footballers from South Holland